Reske is a surname. Notable people with the surname include:

Hans-Joachim Reske (born 1940), German athlete
Scott Reske, American politician
Willy Reske (1897–1991), organist and composer

See also
Riske